MTV Hard Rock Live is a live album by Canadian rock band Simple Plan.

Track listing

Bonus tracks

The bonus tracks, excluding Welcome to My Life (Acoustic version) And Perfect (Acoustic version) are only available on the deluxe edition.

Versions
In 2005, Simple Plan released the live album, MTV Hard Rock Live which contained songs from both of their previous albums.  The album came in two different versions — a standard one, and a fan pack edition.  The standard edition included audio of the whole performance, an acoustic version of Crazy, two live videos of the performance of the first two songs "Jump" and "Shut Up!", and a small booklet of pictures of the performance.  The fan pack edition contained audio and video of the whole performance in 5.1 surround sound, three acoustic tracks for "Crazy", "Welcome to My Life", and "Perfect", a 32-page color tour book, and an exclusive Simple Plan patch and pin.

Certifications

References

External links

MTV Hard Rock Live at YouTube (streamed copy where licensed)

Simple Plan albums
2005 live albums
Lava Records live albums
Atlantic Records live albums